James Rosette (born July 9, 1938) is an American boxer. He competed in the men's middleweight event at the 1964 Summer Olympics. At the 1964 Summer Olympics, he lost to Joe Darkey of Ghana.

References

1938 births
Living people
American male boxers
Olympic boxers of the United States
Boxers at the 1964 Summer Olympics
People from Jennings, Louisiana
Middleweight boxers